Cope North is an annual multinational military exercise taking place in and around Guam. The first exercise took place in 1978.

In 2016 in addition to US, Japanese and Australian forces South Korea, the Philippines and New Zealand participated. This was the largest ever Cope North exercise. 2017 and 2018 saw a return to the usual participants - US, Japanese and Australian forces.

References

Australian military exercises
Military aviation exercises
Military exercises involving the United States
United States Air Force exercises
Military locations of Guam
Japanese military exercises
Japan–United States relations
Recurring events established in 1978